TDR may refer to:

Science and medicine
 Telecommunications for Disaster Relief, a proposed standard
 Time-domain reflectometry, a measuring method
 Time-domain reflectometer, an instrument used for time-domain reflectometry
 Radiolabeled thymidine (TdR)
 Totally drug-resistant, the ability of a microbe to resist the effects of all known drugs

Organizations
 The Designers Republic, a former graphic design studio in England
 Tony D'Alberto Racing, an Australian V8 Supercar motor racing team

Other
  TDR (journal), The Drama Review, an academic journal
Tokyo Disney Resort, Japan
 Interstate TDR, WWII US Navy aerial drone
 Timeout Detection and Recovery, a feature in the Windows operating system that allows it to recover from video driver errors
 Transferable development rights, a method for controlling land use
 Troubled debt restructuring, a debt restructuring process
 Total dependency ratio, ratio of dependents to workers
 Total DramaRama, an animated series on Cartoon Network